Jack Mitchell may refer to:
Jack Mitchell (author), American chairman of the Mitchells family of stores
Jack Mitchell (American football) (1923–2009), American football player and coach
Jack Mitchell (Australian footballer, born 1911) (1911–1963), Australian footballer for Hawthorn
Jack Mitchell (Australian footballer, born 1924) (1924–1978), Australian footballer for Melbourne
Jack Mitchell (banker) (1897-1985), American banker and airline founder
Jack Mitchell (drummer), drummer of British indie band Haven
Jack Mitchell (character), recurring fictional character in the short stories of Henry Lawson
Jack Mitchell (jockey), English jockey
Jack Mitchell (photographer) (1925–2013), American photographer and author of dance, and iconic artist images
Jack Mitchell (racing driver)

See also
Jackie Mitchell (disambiguation)
John Mitchell (disambiguation)